Sverdlovsk (translit. Sverdlovs’k) is a city in Luhansk Oblast (region) of south-eastern Ukraine on the border with the Russian Federation. Serving as the administrative center of Sverdlovsk Raion (district), the city itself is incorporated as a city of oblast significance, does not belong to the raion, and is located approximately 80 km from the oblast capital, Luhansk. On 12 May 2016 it was renamed  Dovzhansk (translit.  Dovzhansʹk) by the Ukrainian government as part of decommunization. The city is controlled by the self-declared Luhansk People's Republic and the name change has not been enforced. Its population is estimated to be .

From the point of view of Ukrainian authorities Sverdlovsk, as Dovzhansk, serves the administrative center of Dovzhansk Raion.

Most of the city residents work in the mining industry. The city municipality also includes the city of Chervonopartyzansk (Voznesenivka), six urban-type settlements, and several smaller settlements.

The city serves as an international gateway between Ukraine and Russia and has border checkpoint in Chervonopartyzansk.

History
The city tracks its roots from a small village in the headstream of Dovzhyk River (Sharapka). At the end of the 18th century, it was granted by Catherine II of Russia to ataman Vasyl Orlov as a reward for his excellent military service. The farmland took on the name Dovzhykove-Orlovske (Sharapkyne). Development of the area significantly expanded towards the end of the 19th century, after the discovery of coal in the Donetsk region.

In 1938 a number of local settlements as well as the Sverdlov mine (today is part of the Sverdlovantratsyt company) were merged into the city of Sverdlovsk in memory of the Bolshevik leader Yakov Sverdlov.

A local newspaper is published in the city since November 1938.

Starting mid-April 2014 pro-Russian separatists captured several towns in Luhansk Oblast; including Sverdlovsk.

Demographics
As of the 2001 census, the city's ethnic composition was as follows:
 Russians: 48.6%
 Ukrainians: 46%
 Others: 2.4%
 Belarusians: 1.2%

Gallery

References

External links
 Official city page 
 City site
 Bondar, O. ''Sverdlovsk. The history of cities and villages of the Ukrainian SSR.

Cities in Luhansk Oblast
Sverdlovsk, Luhansk Oblast
Cities of regional significance in Ukraine
City name changes in Ukraine
Populated places established in 1938
Populated places established in the Ukrainian Soviet Socialist Republic
Soviet toponymy in Ukraine
Don Host Oblast